Ditrigona candida is a moth in the family Drepanidae. It was described by Wilkinson in 1968. It is found in the Yunnan province of Southwest China.

References

Moths described in 1968
Drepaninae
Moths of Asia